Demon Days Live was a limited concert tour performed by the British alternative rock virtual band Gorillaz, in support of their second studio album Demon Days. Demon Days Live consisted of two residencies, with five shows played at the Manchester Opera House in England, and another five played at New York City's Apollo Theater. The Manchester residency was later released onto DVD as Demon Days: Live at the Manchester Opera House. One of the New York shows was broadcast on MHD (now MTV Live) as Gorillaz: Live in Harlem. The Manchester Opera House film was later nominated for a Grammy Award for Best Music Film.

Live band
 Damon Albarn – vocals, piano, melodica
 Mike Smith – keyboards
 Simon Tong – guitar
 Simon Jones – guitar
 Morgan Nicholls – bass
 Cass Browne – drums
 Darren Galea – turntable
 Karl Vanden Bossche – percussion
 Wayne Hernandez – backing vocals
 Sharlene Hector – backing vocals
 Rosie Wilson – backing vocals
 Wendi Rose – backing vocals
 Aaron Sokell – backing vocals
 Isabelle Dunn – cello
 Dan Keane – cello
 Deborah Chandler – cello
 Emma Smith – bass
 Amanda Drummond – viola
 Nina Kapinsky – viola
 Gary Pomeroy – viola
 Antonia Pagulatos – violin
 Jennifer Berman – violin
 Kirsty Mangan – violin

Guest collaborators and additional musicians
 Neneh Cherry – vocals on "Kids with Guns"
 Bootie Brown – vocals on "Dirty Harry"
 De La Soul – vocals on "Feel Good Inc"
 Ike Turner – piano on "Every Planet We Reach is Dead"
 MF Doom – vocals on "November Has Come" (video only)
 Roots Manuva – vocals on "All Alone"
 Martina Topley-Bird – vocals on "All Alone"
 Rosie Wilson – vocals on "Dare"
 Shaun Ryder – vocals on "Dare"
 Dennis Hopper – narration on "Fire Coming Out of the Monkey's Head" (New York dates only)
 London Community Gospel Choir – vocals on "Don't Get Lost in Heaven" and "Demon Days"
 Zeng Zhen – guzheng on "Hong Kong"
 Ibrahim Ferrer – vocals on "Latin Simone (¿Qué Pasa Contigo?)" (video only)

Production

Demon Days Live marked the first Gorillaz concerts where the live band performed in full view of the audience, forgoing the "behind-the-screen" setup of Gorillaz' previous tour. Visuals and music videos tailor-made for the shows played on a large screen above the band, while the band themselves were kept silhouetted by a combination of dim lighting and colorful, illuminated back-paneling. Puppets of 2-D and Murdoc were utilized during intros and intermissions, addressing the audience and commenting on the show from the venues' balconies. The lifesize puppets were created by Jim Henson's Creature Shop; the Jim Henson Company would later award Gorillaz with the "Jim Henson Creativity Honor".

A Las Vegas residency was considered, but the "astronomical" production cost of previous shows dissuaded the band from continuing the concerts. Speaking on tour expenses, Gorillaz co-creator Jamie Hewlett explained: "The idea of putting it on in Vegas really appealed, but in the end it would have cost too much. The Demon Days Live shows actually ended up costing Damon and I money overall."

Setlist
The following setlist is obtained from the concert held in Manchester on 1 November 2005. This setlist accurately represents all shows on the tour.

Tour dates

References

Gorillaz concert tours
2005 concert tours
2006 concert tours